Yasushi Warita (born January 8, 1971) is a Japanese mixed martial artist. He competed in the Welterweight division.

Mixed martial arts record

|-
| Loss
| align=center| 1–4–1
| Yuki Sasaki
| Submission (heel hook)
| Shooto: Gig '98 1st
| 
| align=center| 1
| align=center| 1:19
| Tokyo, Japan
| 
|-
| Win
| align=center| 1–3–1
| Toru Koga
| KO (head kick)
| Shooto: Vale Tudo Junction 3
| 
| align=center| 3
| align=center| 0:18
| Tokyo, Japan
| 
|-
| Loss
| align=center| 0–3–1
| Akihiro Gono
| Submission (achilles lock)
| Lumax Cup: Tournament of J '96
| 
| align=center| 1
| align=center| 0:54
| Japan
| 
|-
| Loss
| align=center| 0–2–1
| Kazuhiro Kusayanagi
| Submission (armbar)
| Shooto: Vale Tudo Access 4
| 
| align=center| 1
| align=center| 1:53
| Japan
| 
|-
| Draw
| align=center| 0–1–1
| Naoki Sakurada
| Draw
| Vale Tudo Japan 1994
| 
| align=center| 5
| align=center| 3:00
| Urayasu, Chiba, Japan
| 
|-
| Loss
| align=center| 0–1
| Takeshi Tanaka
| Submission (achilles lock)
| Lumax Cup: Tournament of J '94
| 
| align=center| 1
| align=center| 1:02
| Japan
|

See also
List of male mixed martial artists

References

External links
 
 Yasushi Warita at mixedmartialarts.com

1971 births
Japanese male mixed martial artists
Welterweight mixed martial artists
Living people